The  is a local history museum in Mito, Ibaraki, Japan. It is one of Japan's many museums which are supported by a prefecture.

The museum opened in September 1974. The collection focuses on the history of Ibaraki and the grounds also include a number of Edo-period farm buildings and examples of western-style Japanese architecture from the Meiji period. The collection also houses numerous artworks, historical artifacts and extensive documentation from the Tokugawa clan, who ruled Mito Domain during the Edo period.

See also
 Kōdōkan
 Kairaku-en
 Prefectural museum

References

External links
  

History museums in Japan
Prefectural museums
Museums in Ibaraki Prefecture
Museums established in 1974
1974 establishments in Japan
Mito, Ibaraki
Giyōfū architecture